Vladimir Georgiyevich Andreev (born 14 June 1945 in Moscow) is a retired Russian basketball player. At 2.15 m (7'0 ") tall, he played at the center position. He was among the 105 player nominees for the 50 Greatest EuroLeague Contributors list.

Professional career
In 1969, while playing with CSKA Moscow, Andreev  won the European Champions' Cup (EuroLeague) championship against Real Madrid, being the top scorer of the EuroLeague Final, with 37 points.

Soviet national team
Andreev was also a member of the senior men's Soviet national team, from 1967 to 1971.

References

1945 births
Living people
ASK Riga players
Basketball players at the 1968 Summer Olympics
Centers (basketball)
FIBA EuroBasket-winning players
Medalists at the 1968 Summer Olympics
Olympic basketball players of the Soviet Union
Olympic bronze medalists for the Soviet Union
Olympic medalists in basketball
PBC CSKA Moscow players
Basketball players from Moscow
Soviet men's basketball players
1967 FIBA World Championship players
1970 FIBA World Championship players
FIBA World Championship-winning players